The earliest Imperial Records was a short-lived United States-based company of the 1900s (decade), producing single-sided lateral cut gramophone records. Issues included ragtime banjo music, operatic solos, and Hebrew songs.  As the name implies, they seem to have been destined at least in part for the British market.  The back of the records carried a paper label printed with a copyright statement.

See also
 List of record labels
 Imperial Records

References

Record labels established in 1900
Defunct record labels of the United States